This is a list of the 103 municipalities in the province of Almería, Spain.

By population

Note: + a 103rd municipality, Balanegra, was created in 2015 from part of Berja municipality.

See also
Geography of Spain
List of Spanish cities

References

 
Almeria